Anatoly Yemelyanovich Gurinovich (9 September 1924 – 9 April 1999) was a Belarusian statesman and diplomat from Byelorussian SSR. He served as the second foreign minister of Byelorussian SSR from 14 May 1966 to 17 July 1990 for 24 years after replacing Kuzma Kiselyov. He graduated from the Belarus State Economic University and in 1951, he joined the Diplomatic Academy of the Ministry of Foreign Affairs of the Russian Federation. He died on 9 April 1999, aged 74.

Further reading 
 «Дипломатический словарь» под ред. А. А. Громыко, А. Г. Ковалева, П. П. Севостьянова, С. Л. Тихвинского в 3-х томах, М., «Наука», 1985–1986. — Т. 1, с. 278—279 (in Russian).

External links 
 Biography Info 

1924 births
1999 deaths
People from Chervyen District
Belarus State Economic University alumni
Members of the Central Committee of the Communist Party of Byelorussia
Members of the Supreme Soviet of the Byelorussian Soviet Socialist Republic
Recipients of the Order of Friendship of Peoples
Recipients of the Order of the Red Banner of Labour
Foreign ministers of Belarus
Soviet diplomats
Belarusian diplomats
Soviet partisans
Belarusian partisans